The Alternative Law Journal is a quarterly peer-reviewed law journal covering law reform. It is published by  SAGE Publications on behalf of the Legal Service Bulletin Co-operative (Melbourne, Australia). The journal was established in 1974 as the Legal Service Bulletin, obtaining its current name in 1992.

 the editors-in-chief are Melissa Castan (Monash University) and Bronwyn Naylor (RMIT University). The journal is abstracted and indexed in the Emerging Sources Citation Index, EBSCO databases, ProQuest databases, and Scopus.

The Aboriginal Law Bulletin was issued with the Legal Service Bulletin from 1981 to 1991 and with Alternative Law Journal from 1992 to 1995.

References

External links

Speech on the Alternative Law Journal by Michael Kirby, former Justice of the High Court of Australia

Australian law journals
Quarterly journals
SAGE Publishing academic journals
English-language journals
Publications established in 1974